Samir Ganguly is an Indian film director. He also directed many episodes of the television serial Paying Guest].

Filmography

Director

Assistant director
 Tumsa Nahin Dekha (1957)
 Junglee (1961)
 April Fool (1964)

TV serials
 Paying Guest - Some episodes Rajshri Productions

References

External links 
 

20th-century Indian film directors
Hindi-language film directors
Living people
Indian television directors
Year of birth missing (living people)